"Richest Man on Earth" is a song co-written and recorded by American country music artist Paul Overstreet. It was released in April 1990 as the fifth single from his 1989 album Sowin' Love. The song reached No. 3 on the Billboard Hot Country Singles & Tracks chart in August 1990.  It was written by Overstreet and Don Schlitz.

Chart performance

Year-end charts

References

1990 singles
1989 songs
Paul Overstreet songs
Songs written by Paul Overstreet
Songs written by Don Schlitz
Song recordings produced by James Stroud
RCA Records singles